Deterrence may refer to:

 Deterrence theory, a theory of war, especially regarding nuclear weapons
 Deterrence (penology), a theory of justice
 Deterrence (psychology), a psychological theory
 Deterrence (film), a 1999 drama starring Kevin Pollak, depicting fictional events about nuclear brinkmanship
 Nuclear deterrence